The Water Polo Tournament at the 2007 Pan American Games was won by the United States men's and women's teams.

Men's competition

Group A

Group B

Semifinals

Classification 5-8

Finals

Classification 7-8

Classification 5-6

Bronze medal match

Gold Medal match

Final classification

Women's competition

Preliminary round

Semifinals

Finals

Classification 5-6

Bronze medal match

Gold Medal match

Final classification

P
2007
Events at the 2007 Pan American Games
2007